Ruellia paulayana is a species of plant in the family Acanthaceae. It is endemic to Yemen.

References

Endemic flora of Socotra
paulayana
Vulnerable plants
Taxonomy articles created by Polbot
Plants described in 1906